Shamrock Park is a public park located in Shoreview, Minnesota, United States.  It services the residents of Shoreview as well as the larger Twin Cities community.

Park features
Shamrock Park has numerous amenities, including picnic shelter, sporting areas including a soccer field, basketball court, hockey rink, tennis courts and baseball/softball fields.  There is a  trail system though the park, including around a small, leech-filled pond.  There is also an interactive children's playground combining traditional play with natural play.

History
The earliest reference to Shamrock Park is in the late 1840s. The land was then a popular resting place for Native American travelers and later a popular wagon trail to Duluth. Native Americans traditionally used adjacent marsh land for food and rice production. As the town grew, buildings around Shamrock Park emerged, including Willis Wilson’s property that hosted the first meetings of the new mayor and community leaders. In 1885 Mark Twain stopped by Shamrock Park on his book tour promoting Adventures of Huckleberry Finn.

As time passed, the government shifted away from the Shamrock Park area and the residential community grew around it, embracing the park as an anchor for the city. In more recent years, Shamrock was host to a campaign stop by future President Ronald Reagan and many other events such as beer dabblers, weddings, ice skating competitions and frisbee golf tournaments. In 2004, the 3M Pavilion was constructed as part of an extensive park remodel.

References

Parks in Minnesota
Protected areas of Ramsey County, Minnesota